iTunes Originals - Keith Urban is an album released to iTunes on 21 July 2009 by Australian country music artist Keith Urban.

Content
iTunes Originals - Keith Urban contains twelve interview tracks, in which Urban talks to listeners, telling them about the songs and other events happening before, during, or after the songs' release. It also contains ten previously released singles, as well as the non-single "Raise the Barn" from Love, Pain & the Whole Crazy Thing. Six of these eleven songs have been remixed by iTunes.

Track listing

Chart performance

References

Keith Urban albums
ITunes Originals
2009 live albums
2009 compilation albums
Capitol Records compilation albums
Capitol Records live albums